Corona de lágrimas (English: Crown of tears) may refer to:

Corona de lágrimas (film), a 1968 Mexican film starring Marga López and Enrique Lizalde
Corona de lágrimas (1965 telenovela)
Corona de lágrimas (2012 telenovela)